USS Grand Forks (PG-119/PF-11), a  patrol frigate, was the only ship of the United States Navy to be named for Grand Forks, North Dakota.

Construction
Grand Forks, originally classified as patrol gunboat, PG-119, was reclassified as a patrol frigate, PF-11, on 15 April 1943. She was laid down on 29 September 1943, under a Maritime Commission (MARCOM) contract, MC hull 1429, at the Permanente Metals Richmond Shipyard #4, Richmond, California. Grand Forks was launched on 27 November 1943, sponsored by Mrs. T. H. Thoreson; and commissioned on 18 March 1944.

Service history
After shakedown, on 7 August 1944, Grand Forks sailed from San Francisco, California, to take station in the Northern Pacific off the California coast as a plane guard ship, returning to San Francisco, on 3 September. She continued on this duty until decommissioning, spending an average of 3 weeks at sea and 2 in port.

Late in the night 11 October 1944, Grand Forks picked up a distress call from a Consolidated PB2Y Coronado about to make an emergency landing. Sending up flares and star shells to guide the plane through the dark, Grand Forks rescued 15 crewmen and passengers from the sea, as well as 114 sacks of mail.

While in port from guard duty on 31 May 1945, Grand Forks was toured by several members of the American delegation to the San Francisco Peace Conference, including Secretary of State and Mrs. Edward Stettinius, Nelson Rockefeller, and Alger Hiss.

She continued on plane guard duty until 19 March 1946, and then sailed from San Francisco to Charleston, South Carolina, where she decommissioned on 16 May 1946. Grand Forks was stricken from the Navy Register on 19 June 1946; sold to J. C. Berkwit & Company of New York on 19 May 1947, and scrapped starting on 1 November 1947.

References

Bibliography

External links  

 
hazegray.org: USS Grand Forks

Tacoma-class frigates
World War II patrol vessels of the United States
Greater Grand Forks
Ships built in Richmond, California
1943 ships